100th meridian may refer to:

100th meridian east, a line of longitude east of the Greenwich Meridian
100th meridian west, a line of longitude west of the Greenwich Meridian